Zaviyeh-ye Kord (also Romanized as Zāvīyeh-ye Kord, Zāvīeh Kord, and Zāvīeh-ye Kord; also known as Zeīwa and Zeyva) is a village in Sanjabad-e Shomali Rural District, in the Central District of Kowsar County, Ardabil Province, Iran. At the 2006 census, its population was 379, in 81 families.

References 

Towns and villages in Kowsar County